Tusheti Strict Nature Reserve is located in the Tusheti Mountainous region in the north-eastern part of Georgia. Visitors center is located in village lower Alvani, Akhmeta Municipality.

The Tusheti Protected Areas includes Tusheti Strict Nature Reserve, Tusheti National Park and Tusheti Protected Landscape with total protected area about 113,660.2 ha.
It is one of the eight new Protected Areas approved by Parliament of Georgia on 22 April 2003.

Flora 

Flora of Tusheti region is highly endemic to Caucasus represented by 230 endemic plants which is more than 20% of total amount of endemics found in entire Caucasus region.

This includes Tushetian Monkshood (Aconitum tuscheticum), Iberian barberry (Berberis iberica), bellflower (Campanula), bear nut-tree (Corylus iberica), lily (Pancratium), Tushetian Dog-rose (Rosa tuschetica), Tebulo's buttercup (Ranunculus tebulossicus)  Black or Radde's birch (Betula raddeana), Caucasian fritillaries (Fritillaria caucasica), yellow Caucasian fritillaries (Fritillaria lutea), Juliana Primrose (Primula juliae), Georgian Snow Rose (Rhododendron caucasicum), squill (Scilla) to name just a few.

Fauna 
Fauna is represented by 60 species of mammals, about 120 species of birds, 4 species of reptiles, 6 species of amphibians and 1 species of fish.

See also 
 List of protected areas of Georgia
Tusheti National Park
Tusheti Protected Landscape
List of mammals of Georgia (country)
List of birds of Georgia (country)
Caucasus-Anatolian-Hyrcanian temperate forest

References 

National parks of Georgia (country)
Protected areas established in 2003
Geography of Kakheti
Tourist attractions in Kakheti